"Love Resurrection" is a pop song written by English singer-songwriter Alison Moyet and producers Jolley & Swain for Moyet's debut studio album Alf (1984). Released as the album's first single in June 1984, it reached number 10 in the UK Singles Chart. It was released in the US in summer 1985 following "Invisible" and reached number 82 on the Billboard Hot 100 that August.

Background
Speaking to Number One in 1984, Moyet said "Love Resurrection" was "written over the phone": "I'd had an argument with a friend and gone to bed like I usually do when I'm depressed. I wrote the lyric straight off and read it over to Steve [Jolley]. He called me back with a melody line and we went on from there."

Music videos
There are two versions of the music video. The first version, made for the worldwide single release, shows Moyet at a Middle Eastern encampment in the desert. As she wanders through, the camera pans across the barren landscape and zooms in on a skull figure. The video was shot in Israel and cost £17,000.

The second version, made for the American market, showed a softer side to Moyet following the breakup of Yazoo. The video shows Moyet, dressed all in white, performing the song in a darkened venue with a backup band in front of a small audience.

Reception
Upon release, Max Bell of Number One noted the song's "MOR direction" and commented: "Alf gives it loads but the Swain and Jollified electronic wash which accompanies is not entirely suitable and leaves you feeling that here is a catchphrase in search of a song. Tender but disposable." In a Number One review of Moyet's follow-up single "All Cried Out", Paul Bursche praised "Love Resurrection" as being "magnificent, perhaps the best song of 1984". Jessi McGuire of Record Mirror noted a "hideous similarity with Justin Haywood in the chorus", but added: "Alison proves here that she's still the queen of the larger lady singers, with a cool bit of summer pop that ought to be a great hit."

Track listing
7" single
"Love Resurrection" – 3:49
"Baby I Do" – 3:10

7" single (US promo)
"Love Resurrection" – 3:49
"Love Resurrection" – 3:49

12" single
"Love Resurrection" (Long Version) – 5:33
"Baby I Do" – 3:10

12" single
"Love Resurrection" (Love Injected Remix) – 8:48
"Baby I Do" – 3:10

12" single (US promo)
"Love Resurrection" (Album Version) – 5:33
"Love Resurrection" (Single Version) – 3:49

Versions
"Love Resurrection" (Single Version)  - 3:49
 "Love Resurrection" (Love Injected Mix a.k.a. Long Version) - 8:50
 "Love Resurrection" (US Long Version) - 5:31

Charts

Year-end charts

In other media
In 2006, "Love Resurrection" appeared in the video game Grand Theft Auto: Vice City Stories. The song can be heard on a fictional pop/rock/New Wave radio station called Flash FM.

Cover versions
A dance/pop cover in the genre of gospel music was released on inspirational US singer Kim Boyce's debut album in 1986. There were minor lyric changes to the song to incorporate it into the gospel genre.

A dance cover by D'Lux was released in June 1996 and reached number 58 in the UK charts.

In 2009, UK band Aurora released their version, with vocals by Amanda Wilson.

References

1984 debut singles
Alison Moyet songs
Songs written by Alison Moyet
Songs written by Tony Swain (musician)
Songs written by Steve Jolley (songwriter)
Song recordings produced by Jolley & Swain
1984 songs
Columbia Records singles